Brentford Bay is an Arctic waterway in Kitikmeot Region, Nunavut, Canada. It is located in the west of the Gulf of Boothia.

To the north of the bay is Somerset Island, to the west is the Murchison Promontory, to the south is the Boothia Peninsula, and to the east the bay opens into the Gulf of Boothia. The settlement of Fort Ross lies just north of the bay.

Bays of Kitikmeot Region